Blatina may refer to:

 Blatina, village in Montenegro
 Blatina, wine from Herzegovina (Bosnia and Herzegovina)